Congleton is an unincorporated community in McLean County, in the U.S. state of Kentucky.

History
A post office called Congleton was established in 1887, and remained in operation until it was discontinued in 1914.

References

Unincorporated communities in McLean County, Kentucky
Unincorporated communities in Kentucky